Jamshid Ghanbari Maman (born in 1950 in Mianeh County-Village Maman) is an Iranian politician, former chief executive officer and expert on transportation who acts as an adviser of Civil Commission of  Islamic Consultative Assembly of I.R.Iran.
He was a member of Islamic Consultative Assembly of I.R.Iran in fourth and fifth parliament, also He has been active as First Deputy chairman (Fourth parliament) and chairman (Fifth parliament) of Transportation, Housing and Urban Development Commission of Islamic Consultative Assembly of I.R.Iran.

Since 2000; Mr. Ghanbari was chairman and CEO of Iranian Helicopter Company (IHC) for ten years, as Senior Adviser of the minister when Mr.Bijan Namdar Zangeneh and Mr.Kazem Vaziri Hamaneh have been active as a minister of Ministry of Petroleum of I.R.Iran and, also Senior Adviser of the minister while Mr.Rahman Dadman, Mr.Ahmad Khorram and Mr.Mohammad Rahmati have been active as a minister of Ministry of Road and Transportation of I.R.Iran for eight years, and chairman of Iranian Naft Airlines for four years.

Since 2001; He was Plenipotentiary representative of the minister of petroleum regarding to the owned airports of Ministry of Petroleum of I.R.Iran while Mr.Bijan Namdar Zangeneh, Mr.Kazem Vaziri Hamaneh, Mr.Gholam-Hossein Nozari and Mr.Masoud Mir-Kazemi have been active as minister of the ministry for nine years. Also, he was Senior Adviser of CEO of National Iranian Oil Company (NIOC)
 from 2010 to 2012.

Records
Adviser of Civil Commission of  Islamic Consultative Assembly of I.R.Iran, since 2008
Senior Adviser of CEO of National Iranian Oil Company (NIOC) for two years, from 2010 to 2012
chairman and CEO of Iranian Helicopter Company (IHC) for ten years, from 2000 to 2010
Plenipotentiary representative of the minister of petroleum regarding to the owned airports of Ministry of Petroleum of I.R.Iran for ten years, from 2000 to 2010
Senior Adviser of the minister of Petroleum for eight years, from 2000 to 2007
Senior Adviser of the minister of Road and Transportation for eight years, from 2000 to 2007
chairman of Iranian Naft Airlines for four years, from 2000 to 2007
chairman of Transportation, Housing and Urban Development Commission of Islamic Consultative Assembly of I.R.Iran-Fifth parliament for four years, from 1996 to 2000
Member of Parliament of Islamic Consultative Assembly of I.R.Iran-Fifth Parliament with 49.8% of votes cast for four years, from 1996 to 2000
First Deputy Chairman of Transportation, Housing and Urban Development Commission of Islamic Consultative Assembly of I.R.Iran-Fourth Parliament for four years, from 1992 to 1996
Member of Parliament of Islamic Consultative Assembly of I.R.Iran-Fourth Parliament with 44.2% of votes cast for four years, from 1992 to 1996
Head of Department of Electrical Engineering of Iran Civil Aviation Organization and Expert in charge of Electronic Flight Control Center during Holy Defense (Iran–Iraq War)
Expert in charge of Electrical Engineering Airlines of Iran Civil Aviation Organization for sixteen years, from 1976 to 1992

Memberships
Joint Commission of Islamic Consultative Assembly of I.R.Iran
Committee of the Third Development Plan in Ministry of Road and Transportation of I.R.Iran
Committee of the Third Development Plan in Ministry of Housing and Urban Development
Council of Occupation of East Azerbaijan Province, selected by Islamic Consultative Assembly of I.R.Iran
International Summit of Inter-Parliamentary held in China, selected by Islamic Consultative Assembly of I.R.Iran
International Summit of International Civil Aviation Organization held in Canada (Three Periods)

References

Living people
People from Mianeh
Iranian diplomats
1950 births
Iranian electrical engineers
Members of the 4th Islamic Consultative Assembly
Members of the 5th Islamic Consultative Assembly
Deputies of Mianeh
Iranian chief executives